All'ultimo minuto (At The Last Minute) is an Italian television series.

See also
List of Italian television series

External links
 

1971 Italian television series debuts
1973 Italian television series endings
1970s Italian television series